Giovanna Tacconi Messini (1717–1742) was an Italian painter.

A native of Florence, Messini was married to the pastellist Ferdinando Messini, sometimes called Messinia. She worked as a copyist and painted in oils and fresco, but was especially known for her talent as a portraitist in pastels. Her work was compared by one contemporary to that of Rembrandt and Jacob Jordaens, and her pastels after Raphael and Titian were highly sought after in her day. After her death her husband erected a memorial in her honor in the church of Santissima Annunziata.

References

1717 births
1742 deaths
Italian women painters
18th-century Italian painters
18th-century Italian women artists
Painters from Florence
Italian portrait painters
Pastel artists